Richard Fortin may refer to:
 Richard Fortin (cricketer), (born 1941)
 Richard Fortin (businessman), (born 1949/1950)